Bill Kovacs (25 October 1949 – 30 May 2006) was a pioneer of commercial computer animation technology.

Early career
Kovacs received a Bachelor of Architecture degree from Carnegie Mellon University in 1971. He worked for Skidmore, Owings and Merrill (New York office) while getting a Masters of Environmental Design from Yale University (1972). He was then transferred to the Chicago Office, where he worked on a computer-aided design system.

Computer animation
In 1978, Kovacs left SOM to become VP of R&D for the early computer animation company Robert Abel and Associates (1978-1984).

At Abel, Kovacs (along with Roy Hall and others) developed the company's animation software. Kovacs used this software, with others in the film Tron. He later co-founded Wavefront Technologies as CTO (1984-1994), leading the development of products such as The Advanced Visualizer as well as animated productions. Along with Richard Childers and Chris Baker, he was a key organizer of the Infinite Illusions at the Smithsonian Institution exhibit in 1991.

Following retirement from Wavefront, Kovacs co-founded Instant Effects, worked as a consultant to Electronic Arts and RezN8, serving as RezN8’s CTO from 2000 until his death.

In 1998, Kovacs received a 1997 (Scientific and Engineering) Academy Award from the Academy of Motion Picture Arts and Sciences. In 1980, he received two Clio Awards for his work on animated TV commercials.

Educator
Kovacs was a Visiting Artist at Loyola Marymount University, and he served on the President's Board of Advisors at Academy of Art University from 2002 until his death in 2006 following a stroke.

In 2005, Bill Kovacs, a member of the adjunct faculty in the Department of Animation at Woodbury University, developed and taught The Future of Media: The Evolution of Digital Technology.
 
From 2004 until his death in 2006, he served as a special advisor to Heather Kurze, the dean of the School of Architecture and Design at Woodbury University. Beginning in 2005, Kovacs advised Dori Littell-Herrick, the new chair of the Department of Animation at Woodbury on the role of technology in the growing department, both in facilities and in curriculum.

Together with other faculty, he participated in creating interdisciplinary classes involving architecture and animation students, including "Urban Environments in Maya". Kovacs also assisted Littell-Herrick to broaden the pool of adjunct faculty for the department.

External links

Visiting Artist profile at Loyola Marymount
Santa Barbara News-Press, "Wavefront founder dies at age 56" June 2, 2006
Bill’s LinkedInpage

1949 births
2006 deaths
Recipients of the Scientific and Engineering Academy Award
American animators
20th-century American educators
Animation educators
Computer animation people
Computer graphics professionals
Yale University alumni
Carnegie Mellon University College of Fine Arts alumni
Loyola Marymount University faculty
Woodbury University faculty
Academy of Art University faculty